Biertan is a commune in Transylvania, Romania, in the north of the Sibiu County, 80 km north of Sibiu and 29 km east of Mediaș. Biertan is one of the most important Saxon villages with fortified churches in Transylvania, having been on the list of UNESCO World Heritage Sites since 1993. The Biertan fortified church was the seat of the Lutheran Evangelical Bishop in Transylvania between 1572 and 1867.

The commune is composed of three villages: Biertan, Copșa Mare, and Richiș, each of which has a fortified church.

History 

The first documentary testimony about the village dates from 1283 in a document about the taxes paid by the inhabitants of 7 villages and so it is believed to have been founded sometime between 1224 and 1283 by Transylvanian Saxons. The village settlement quickly developed into an important market town and by 1510 Biertan supported a population of about 5,000 people. Between 1468 and the 16th century a small fortified church was constructed and developed. After the medieval period, the settlement declined in importance with the rise of neighbouring Sighișoara, Sibiu, and Mediaș.

In the Romanian census of 1930, Biertan had 2,331 inhabitants, of whom 1,228 were Transylvanian Saxons. During World War II many men were conscripted into the Romanian army and later on forcefully drafted in the Waffen-SS. After the war, many Transylvanian Saxons were deported from the region to labour camps in the former Soviet Union (USSR). During communism, many left for West Germany. Following the collapse of communism in 1990, many more left for Germany.

Today the whole commune has a population of about 2,500 and the village of Biertan alone has about 1,600 people. It is one of the most visited villages in Transylvania, being the historically important place of the annual reunion of the Transylvanian Saxons, many of whom now live in Germany.

Festivals 

The "Luna Plină" ("Full Moon") Horror and Fantasy Film Festival takes place in Biertan. It is the only film festival in Romania focused exclusively on fantasy movies.

Natives 

 Johann Peter Migendt (1703–1767), organ builder
 Artur Phleps (1881–1944), a Biertan-born military career officer. He, uniquely, served in the Habsburg army of Austria-Hungary, the royal army of Romania and finally the Waffen-SS.
  (1903–1960), bishop
 Sara Römischer. Although she was not famous in the traditional sense, her story is representative of that experienced by many Transylvanian Saxons in Biertan following the Second World War. Sara was deported to Siberia in January 1945. She survived and after five years returned to her hometown of Biertan to bring up her family through many further hardships. Read an English translation of her harrowing story, or for the original German text in Siebenbürgische Zeitung).

Demographics 

According to the 2011 census, Romanians made up 73.8% of the population, Roma made up 17.9%, Germans (more specifically Transylvanian Saxons) made up 4.6%, and Hungarians made up 3.6%.

Gallery

See also 

 Biertan Donarium
 List of castles in Romania
 Villages with fortified churches in Transylvania

References

External links 

  Information and pictures about Biertan
  Info about Biertan
  Impressions of Biertan
  Info and pictures about Biertan
 Fortified church in Biertan
 video
 video

Communes in Sibiu County
Localities in Transylvania
Villages with fortified churches in Transylvania
Articles containing video clips